The Syrian Navy, officially the Syrian Arab Navy, is the navy branch of the Syrian Armed Forces. The main role of the Syrian Navy is to defend the country's coasts and ensure the security of the territorial waters of Syria. The Coastal Defense Forces and the Syrian Marines have been attached to the Navy since the late 20th century. The Syrian navy is a relatively small navy with only 4,000 sailors, in addition to 2,500 reservists and 1,500 marines. It is under the Syrian Army's Latakia regional command with its fleet based in the ports of Baniyas, Latakia, Minet el-Beida, and Tartus. It is the smallest part of the Syrian Armed Forces.

History 
On 29 August 1950, the Syrian Navy was established following the procurement of a few naval vessels from France. The initial personnel consisted of army soldiers who had been sent to French naval academies for training. 

29 August is considered an annual holiday for the Syrian navy, which is celebrated every year, and it was also chosen because it was the anniversary of the naval Battle of the Masts in 654.

Yom Kippur War 

During the Yom Kippur War on 6-7 October 1973, the Syrian Arab Navy engaged for the first time in naval battle with Israeli ships in the Latakia area. It was the first battle in history in which both sides used sea-to-sea missile boats in combat.

The Israeli Navy had five missile boats launched from the port of Haifa towards the main positions of the Syrian fleet off the coast City. At first, the Israeli fleet encountered a small reconnaissance boat, and immediately sank it. Then the ships reached a naval minesweeper, which they attacked and immediately downed. 

When the Israeli fleet advanced, it found the main forces of the Syrian fleet, the strongest and most modern militarily, which consisted of three missile boats (two Komar-class missile boats along with an Osa I-class missile boat, a K-123 torpedo boat and a T43-class minesweeper).  

The Syrian boats launched their missiles from a long range that the Israeli ships could not launch from. However, the Israeli fleet had an anti-missile system that could mislead its radars and keep them away from their targets. In real combat however, they succeeded completely and all the missiles missed the target. As a result of the battle, all 5 Syrian ships participating in it were sunk, the Israelis did not suffer any losses.

On 29 August 1989, a Syrian missile boat sank the Maltese tanker Sunshield, which attempted to enter the prohibited zone.

Syrian civil war 

During the Syrian Civil War, opposition activists claimed that Syrian Navy warships supported a military attack by government forces against rebels in the city of Latakia. But the government's version denied that the city was bombed by sea, as it said that the forces of order are chasing armed groups who are attacking property and using the machine guns and the bombs.

Ranks

The rank insignia of commissioned officers.

The rank insignia of non-commissioned officers and enlisted personnel.

Personnel

The number of recruits for the Syrian Arab Navy has reached 4,000 soldiers and 2,500 reservists since the year 1985, and this number has not changed in the census in 2002. Proportion of navy personnel from the total number of recruits Syrian Arab Army; 1.4% in the year 1993. Then the percentage rose to 1.9% of the total army soldiers in the year 2000.

Structure
The Syrian Arab Navy consists of the navy, coastal defense and naval aviation forces.

Marines 

The Syrian Marines follows the forces of naval infantry, consisting of about 1,500 conscripts, whose primary role is to protect the three military naval bases in the country, which are divided into three units, each of which is to protect one of the bases. These Marines have three amphibious assault ships, each of which can carry 100 soldiers and five tanks. 

In general, the Syrian Marine Corps did not receive any special or advanced armament and very little training in the use of amphibious ships, and in general its recruits are only ordinary soldiers and do not have any experience in the ways of fighting as Marines. Although the Soviet Union set up part of Exercise Zapad-81 (the largest military training exercise ever in the entire history of the Soviet Union, and included the largest amphibious landing operation in its history as well), the Syrian soldiers did not participate. 

Also, the Syrian marines were not tried to participate in any real amphibious naval landing during any of the wars that the country fought, they were used as infantry with a direct ground clash in the October War, and they also entered Lebanon Civil War. During the Gulf War II in 1991, Syria put all its marines together with the 17,000 soldiers it sent to Kuwait, which may mean that it considers them combatively highly qualified soldiers.

Coastal Defense 

The Syrian Coastal Defense Forces were placed under the command of the Syrian Arab Navy since 1984. The coastal defense consists of brigade infantry, each of which is responsible for monitoring a specific coastal sector, and in addition to them, there is a battalion that monitors. In addition to these forces, there are two artillery battalions armed with 18 artillery pieces, 130 mm caliber M-46. The Syrian coastal defense is also armed with Styx, Sepal, YJ-83 and P-800 Oniks missiles, as well as K-300P Bastion-P coastal defense missile system.

Bases

Syrian Navy's headquarters is in Damascus and main base is at Latakia on the Mediterranean Sea with other naval bases at Baniyas, Tartus and Minet el-Beida. 

Latakia is Syria’s largest and most active port, as it has 23 berths, and it includes a section for the repair of military ships within its sectors, and some of the navy’s fast missile boats dock in it.

Al-Bayda port is located in the city of Baniyas, it was built specifically for naval military purposes. There are also training centers for naval officers and special soldiers in the port, and some transport ships dock there.

The Port of Tartus is the main base of the Syrian Navy, where the two navy frigates, its three amphibious ships and all its minesweepers dock, as well as some missile boats and navy transport ships. and includes the port 22 A dock with an area of three million square meters.

Russian base in Tartus 

Tartus hosts a Soviet-era naval supply and maintenance base, under a 1971 agreement with Syria. The base was established during the Cold War to support the Soviet Navy's fleet in the Mediterranean Sea. Since Russia forgave Syria three-fourths of its $13.4 billion Soviet-era debt and became its main arms supplier, the two countries have conducted talks about allowing Russia to develop and enlarge its naval base, so that Russia can strengthen its naval presence in the Mediterranean. Amid Russia's deteriorating relations with the West, because of the 2008 Russo-Georgian War and plans to deploy a US missile defense shield in Poland, President Assad agreed to the port’s conversion into a permanent Middle East base for Russia’s nuclear-armed warships. Since 2009, Russia has been renovating the Tartus naval base and dredging the port to allow access for its larger naval vessels.

Fleet

Ship

Naval aviation 
 618th Maritime Warfare Squadron

Coastal defence

Former vessels 
The Syrian Navy once operated three Project 613 submarines.

They operated three s (S-1, S-53, S-101). Built in 1961 for Soviet Navy and transferred to Syria 1985-1987, decommissioned by mid-1990s and all scrapped by 1996.

Syria had two s since 1972. All ships were retired by the mid-1990s.

They also had two s in derelict condition at Tartus port. Both probably retired in 2017 or 2018. One decommissioned Syrian frigate was sunk by the Russian Air Force as a training target on 15 April 2018 off the coast of Syria.

List of vessels
The following table shows the strength of the Syrian Arab Naval Forces according to the year since 1990, in addition to the deals to be concluded in this regard until 2015:

Recent developments

Russia and Iran

In general, the Syrian Arab Navy did not have any modern equipment or weapons until 2006 (except for the OSA I and II anti-ship missile boats), in addition to its modest numbers of recruits compared to the 150-kilometre long Syrian coast. But since 2006, Russia and Iran began providing Syria with advanced weapons, providing it with heavy, short-range land-sea missiles, which are less expensive and more effective in battles than expensive torpedoes and boats, which are easily endangered during sea battles.

Among the types of missiles that Iran and Russia supplied to the Syrian Navy are the Styx anti-ship missiles, intended for use in close-range missile engagement with battleships and warships. In recent years, they have also acquired an unknown number of Sepal missiles, and their possession was not known until they appeared in modern combat tests of the Syrian Arab Army in late 2011. 

The Syrian Navy also has a third type of missile, the Russian-made Yakhont missiles, which Syria purchased from Russia in a military deal in late 2011. These are long-range missiles that have given Syria a strategic military advantage at the Eastern Mediterranean. As for the fourth type of missiles supplied to the Syrian Navy, it is the C-802 anti-ship missile of Chinese origin, which is believed to have been supplied to Syria by Iran.

Syrian Navy hopes to receive two Amur-1650 class submarines. In 2015 a group of Syrian military officials arrived in Moscow to discuss prospects for bilateral military and technical cooperation, including the pair of submarines. The Project-677 or Lada-class diesel submarine, whose export version is known as the Amur 1650, features a new anti-sonar coating for its hull, an extended cruising range, and advanced anti-ship and anti-submarine weaponry.

See also
Syrian Marines

References 

Military of Syria
Syria
1946 establishments in Syria